Engebretson Peak is a peak rising to  between Sladen Summit and Borg Bastion in the Johns Hopkins Ridge, Royal Society Range, Victoria Land. It was named by the Advisory Committee on Antarctic Names in 1994 after Mark J. Engebretson, an upper atmosphere physicist at Augsburg College, and an authority in the correlation of Arctic, Antarctic, and spacecraft data.

References 

Mountains of Victoria Land
Scott Coast